The 2006 Women's European Union Amateur Boxing Championships were held in the Area Teleferica in Porto Torres, Sardinia, Italy from June 6 to June 11. This was the 1st ever edition of this annual competition, and was organised by the European governing body for amateur boxing, EABA.

78 fighters representing 17 federations competed in 13 weight divisions. Turkey was the most successful country with 2 gold, 4 silver and four bronze medals. Italian star Simona Galassi retired from amateur boxing after winning gold in these games.

Medal winners

Medal count table

References 

2006 Women's European Union Amateur Boxing Championships
European Union Amateur Boxing Championships
2006 Women's European Union Amateur Boxing Championships
Women's European Union Amateur Boxing Championships
International boxing competitions hosted by Italy